Cicindela goryi is a species of tiger beetle from southern India. It was earlier treated as a subspecies of the closely related Cicindela aurofasciata.

Unlike in Cicindela aurofasciata, goryi has the two yellow elytral bands broad and fused to form a cross. They have a wider distribution and are found in the plains of peninsular India unlike aurofasciata which is found in the Western Ghats.

The name goryi derives from the collections of H. L. Gory from which Maximilien Chaudoir described the species.

References 

Insects described in 1852
Goryi
Beetles of Asia